The Regency Council of the Imperial State of Iran, was a nine-member body formed on 13 January 1979 by Mohammad Reza Shah to carry out his duties after he left Iran amidst the Iranian Revolution and served as the symbol of his continued claim on power.

The council was practically dissolved within days, when its head resigned on 22 January 1979 to meet Ayatollah Khomeini.

Background

1953 Regency Council 
On 28 February 1953, it was reported that in a meeting with Prime Minister Mohammad Mosaddegh, the Shah had agreed that during his absence in Iran a regency council consisting of Mosaddegh, Gholamreza Pahlavi (Shah's brother) and Hossein Ala (Minister of Royal Court) should be appointed to act as the regency council.

1979 Regency Council members 

Due to the tensions between Jalaleddin Tehrani and Abbas Gharabaghi Tehrani resigned from the post. He was replaced by Mohammad Ali Varasteh as the head of the council.

See also 
 Council of the Islamic Revolution

References 

Mohammad Reza Pahlavi
Regents of Iran
Iranian Revolution
1979 establishments in Iran
1979 disestablishments in Iran